Rajarata Rejini (Queen of the King's Land) is a daytime passenger train that runs between Vavuniya and Beliatta via Colombo Fort in Sri Lanka.

The Rajarata Rejini is currently the second longest train journey in Sri Lanka covering the more than 3/4 of the Northern Line and the entire length of the Coastal Line. The Matara-bound train departs from Vavuniya at 3:35am, while the Vavuniya-bound train leaves Matara at 9:40am. The trip takes about 10 hours. Although the train has different train numbers, (e.g.: 4085 Colombo fort - Vavunia, 8085 Matara - Colombo Fort) same train runs between Vavuniya and Matara.

Services
The train offers two classes
Second class is more comfortable than the third class.
Third class typically gets very crowded with commuters, And provide only the basic facilities.

Route
The Rajarata Rejini travels the 3/4 length of Sri Lanka Railways' Northern Line and the entire length of the Coastal Line.

The Rajarata Rejini begins its Southbound service at Vavuniya and runs south while calling at all the stations up to Polgahawela from Vavunia and vice versa. From polgahawela she begins her express service while calling at  Alwawwa, Meerigama, Veyangoda, Gampaha, Ragama, Maradana, Colombo Fort, Mount Lavinia, Panadura, Kaluthara South, Aluthgama, Ambalangoda, Hikkaduwa, Galle, Thalpe, Koggala, Ahangama, Weligama, Kamburugamuwa and Matara. From Galle, the train runs backwards to Matara as Galle railways station has been designed as a terminus.

Rolling Stock
The service uses M2, M4, M5, M6 or M8 locomotives pulling Romanian-built ASTRA passenger coaches.

See also
Sri Lanka Railways

List of named passenger trains of Sri Lanka

References

Named passenger trains of Sri Lanka